An Yong-Kwon (Hangul: 안용권, Hanja: 安容權; born October 15, 1982) is a South Korean weightlifter.

At the 2009 World Weightlifting Championships An won the gold medal in the +105 kg category.

References

1982 births
Living people
South Korean male weightlifters
Olympic weightlifters of South Korea
Weightlifters at the 2004 Summer Olympics
Weightlifters at the 2010 Asian Games
Asian Games competitors for South Korea
World Weightlifting Championships medalists
20th-century South Korean people
21st-century South Korean people